The Merced Formation is a geologic formation in California, and also in Oregon and Washington state. It is named for Lake Merced, a natural lake on the western San Francisco coastline.

Geology

California
In the coastal San Francisco Bay Area of California the Merced Formation was deposited in a small sedimentary basin that formed along the San Andreas Fault during the last two million years during the Pliocene age of the Neogene period, in the Cenozoic Era. USGS.gov: "San Andreas Fault and Coastal Geology, from Half Moon Bay to Fort Funston: Crustal Motion, Climate Change, and Human Activity" 

The fault cut the basin into two pieces and moved the pieces apart. It is found on the east side of the fault in western San Francisco and northern San Mateo County.

Fort Funston is on a bluff made up of exposed sedimentary rocks of the Merced Formation, in San Francisco within the NPS Golden Gate National Recreation Area.

Fossils
It preserves fossils dating back to the Neogene period.

See also

 List of fossiliferous stratigraphic units in California
 Paleontology in California
 List of fossiliferous stratigraphic units in Washington (state)
 Paleontology in Washington (state)

References

Pliocene California
Neogene geology of Oregon
Neogene geology of Washington (state)
Pliocene United States
Geology of Marin County, California
Geology of San Francisco
Geology of San Mateo County, California